Municipio XII is an administrative subdivision of the city of Rome. It was first created by Rome's City Council on 19 January 2001 and it has a president who is elected during the mayoral elections.

Originally called Municipio XVI, since 11 March 2013 its borders were modified and its name became Municipio XII.

Subdivision
Municipio XII is divided into 7 urban zones:

Politics
Current allocation of seats in the Municipio XII's parliamentary body as of the 2013 Rome municipal election: 
Democratic Party (PD) 14
People of Freedom (PdL) 4
Left Ecology Freedom 2
Five Star Movement (M5S) 2
Others 3
In May 2013 Cristina Maltese (PD) was elected president. The current majority is formed by Democratic Party and Left Ecology Freedom.

See also
 Massimina
 Forest of Massimina — park.

References

External links

Municipi of Rome
.